Xtro is a 1983 British science fiction horror film directed by Harry Bromley Davenport. Starring Bernice Stegers, Philip Sayer, and Simon Nash, the film focuses on a father who was abducted by aliens and returns to his family three years later, where he goes in search of his son. Production of the film started and completed in February 1982. The film received largely negative reviews, though the special effects were praised.

Plot
As Sam Phillips and his son Tony are playing outside their farm, Sam is suddenly abducted by a bright light. Three years later, the light returns and plants a seed. A half-human, half-alien creature develops from the seed, and is hit by a car; the couple in the car are soon killed. The creature then goes to a cottage nearby, where it attacks and impregnates the young woman living there before dissolving. When she awakens later, her belly rapidly grows to a gargantuan size until she gives birth to a fully formed Sam, killing her. Sam washes himself, steals the driver's clothes and leaves in the car.

Sam seeks out Tony, who lives in an apartment building in London with his mother Rachel, her new Canadian-American boyfriend Joe Daniels, and French au pair Analise Mercier. Tony has recurring nightmares where he wakes up soaked in another person's blood. Sam picks Tony up from school and is found by Rachel. Despite Joe's consternation Sam goes to live with the family, claiming that he can't remember anything. After Tony sees Sam eating the eggs of his pet snake, Sam comforts him and drinks his blood. Tony soon discovers he has paranormal powers, which he uses to send a human-sized toy soldier to slaughter a neighbour who killed his snake and to bring a toy clown to life.

Sam and Rachel visit the farm where they used to live, leaving Tony in Analise's care. During a game of hide-and-seek with Tony, Analise is knocked out by the clown and used as a womb for the alien eggs. Tony sends a toy tank to attack her boyfriend Michael, who is killed by a panther as he tries to flee. Meanwhile, while Sam and Rachel make love at the farm, his skin starts to bleed and decompose. Joe takes Tony to the farm, where Sam takes his son up a hill towards the alien light. Sam, now taking the form of an alien, uses his scream to kill Joe. Sam and Tony enter the light and return to the alien world, leaving Rachel behind. Arriving at home the next day, Rachel finds an overturned refrigerator full of eggs. As she picks up one, Rachel is killed by a newborn creature.

Alternate ending
Director Harry Bromley Davenport originally intended the film to end with Rachel coming home to find the apartment filled with clones of Tony, having apparently come from the alien eggs which the real Tony had left in the refrigerator. The clones then greet Rachel and rub her growing belly as Rachel is now pregnant with Sam’s second child. Rachel then smiles at the scene.

Executive producer Robert Shaye, not thinking the scene's special effects were convincing enough, edited it out and released it for its New York debut with the film ending when Rachel sits down in the field after Sam and Tony have left. Davenport, however, not wanting to have it end on such an abrupt note, created another ending which had Rachel going back to the apartment, picking up one of the eggs, and being attacked by a face-grabbing creature similar to the one that attacked the woman in the cottage. The UK 2018 Blu-Ray release of Xtro included this ending.

Cast

 Philip Sayer as Sam Phillips
 Bernice Stegers as Rachel Phillips
 Danny Brainin as Joe Daniels
 Maryam d'Abo as Analise Mercier
 Simon Nash as Tony Phillips
 Peter Mandell as Clown
 David Cardy as Michael
 Anna Wing as Mrs. Goodman
 Robert Fyfe as Doctor
 Katherine Best as Jane
 Robert Pereno as Ben
 Sean Crawford as the Commando
 Tim Dry as the Monster
 Arthur Whybrow as Mr. Knight
 Susie Silvey as Woman in cottage

Production
Producer Mark Forstater got involved in Xtro when the director Harry Bromley Davenport came to him with a script written by him and Michel Patty. The two had previously met during a screening of Davenport’s directorial debut Whispers of Fear, which impressed Forstater. The film was financed by Ashley Productions Ltd, a subsidiary of a British investment group based in Manchester.

Forstater brought in two other writers, Robert Smith and Iain Cassie, stating that "The plot was kept intact, but the new writers went off into weird and wonderful tangents."

The film had a six-week shooting schedule. Chris Hobbs, a sketch artist, helped sort out the visual concepts for the production, which originally involved a faceless rubber suit for a creature. This was changed to man standing with his back to the ground on his arms and legs. A mime was hired to perform the strange scuttle of the walk.

Release
Alan Jones wrote in a July issue of Cinefantastique that Xtro was initially set to be released by New Line later in 1982. In December 1982, an article in Fangoria scheduled the film for release in February 1983. Xtro was released in March 1983 in the United Kingdom.

When released on home video in 1983, the film was subject to a prosecution case in relation to British obscenity laws. Unlike many other "video nasties", as they were then called, Xtro had actually been passed uncut by the BBFC with an 18 certificate for theatrical release (with both the original and an alternate ending). The film even went on to reach 33rd place in the Gallup British video chart for 1983.

Home media 

It was released on DVD three times in the US by Image Entertainment. The first DVD was released in 2005 as a double feature with sequel Xtro II: The Second Encounter. The second was released in 2006 as a standalone release. The third, released in 2007, was a triple feature alongside Xtro II: The Second Encounter and Skeeter.

In the UK, the Xtro trilogy was released in box-set, remastered anamorphic widescreen with 5.1 for Xtro II and an interview with director Harry Bromley Davenport covering the production of all three films.
It has been released on blu-ray format in the UK in October 2018 by Second Sight, with several featurettes and alternate endings and cuts of the film.

Critical reception 
From contemporary reviews, Alan Jones wrote in Starburst that the film has "occasional flashes of tangential inspiration" but was "really nothing very xtro-ordinary." finding that scenes did not scare him "or even disgusted [him] to any great extent" and that he would have liked more characterisation and that Bernice Stegers was "horribly miscast". Jones went on to state that the special effects were "minor miracles of ingenuity" for their low budget and he at least admired director Metcalfe for "trying so earnestly to resuscitate low budget exploitation sf/horror films in this country." Jo Imeson of the Monthly Film Bulletin described the film as a "sub s-f rip-off" and that it was "entirely lacking in the energy or resonances of It's Alive! horror-within-the-family genre." The review also noted "flat acting" stating that Bernice Stegers was "weighed down by a depressingly one-dimensional role".  The review did note that "one or two effects are quite memorable-the cocoon in the bathroom, the revolving birth of a full-sized man"."Lor." of Variety found the film "too silly and underdeveloped in story values to expand beyond diehard fans" and that "Harry B Davenport builds little suspense and no thrills in a film devoid of stuntwork or action scenes. It's just another "check out that makeup" exercise, consisting of brief scenes and poor continuity" and that "acting is flat, with Stegers [...] inexpressive and unattractively styled." Roger Ebert panned the film, awarding it 1 of 4 stars, calling the film "ugly" and "despairing" and further commenting, "Most exploitation movies are bad, but not necessarily painful to watch. They may be incompetent, they may be predictable, they may be badly acted or awkwardly directed, but at some level the filmmakers are enjoying themselves and at least trying to entertain an audience. 'Xtro' is an exception, a completely depressing, nihilistic film, an exercise in sadness ... It's movies like this that give movies a bad name". Stephen Hunter writing for The Baltimore Sun called the film "the slimiest, wormiest, most nauseating film to come oozing into Baltimore in some time." that was "almost wholly incomprehensible" Hunter went on to state that "what is most depressing about Xtro is that its performances are first-rate, especially Steger's as the distraught Mum" and that the cinematographer by John Metcalfe "displays a good deal of technical finesse, particularly the long, apartment sequence"

Colin Greenland reviewed Xtro for Imagine magazine, and stated that "Xtro is quite unpretentious. It doesn't claim to be anything but a vehicle for Tony Harris' special effects, which are as virulent and glutinous as they come."

From retrospective reviews, TV Guide awarded the film 0 of 4 stars, calling the film, "A vile exercise in grotesque special effects" and "an excuse to parade all manner of perversities across the screen", further stating that, "Not only is this disgusting, it lacks anything that remotely resembles suspense". AllMovie called the movie "pure trash" that was "made to capitalize on public interest in E.T. the Extra-Terrestrial" and "basically presents the gory, sexy exploitation-movie take on that film's 'alien visits Earth' premise."

Sequels
Director Harry Bromley Davenport made two sequels to the film, Xtro II: The Second Encounter and Xtro 3: Watch the Skies. Neither film had anything to do with the original film. In March 2011, Davenport confirmed that Xtro 4 was in the works.

References

Sources

External links
 
 
 

1983 films
1983 horror films
1980s British films
1980s English-language films
1980s monster movies
1980s pregnancy films
1980s science fiction horror films
Alien abduction films
British body horror films
British horror films
British monster movies
British pregnancy films
British science fiction horror films
Films about extraterrestrial life
Films about father–son relationships
Films about rape
Films about sentient toys
Films directed by Harry Bromley Davenport
Films set in London
Films set in the 1980s
Horror films about clowns
Horror films about toys